Association Sportive Madinet d'Oran, known as ASM Oran or ASMO for short, is an Algerian football club based in Oran and founded in 1933. The club colours are green and white. Their home stadium, Habib Bouakeul Stadium, has a capacity of 15,000 spectators. The club plays in the Algerian Ligue 2. The club was famous for its youth program, which has produced many Algerian talents over the years. Because of this, the club is nicknamed El-Madrassa (The School).

History
The club was founded in 1933 in the quarter of Medina Jedida in Oran under the name of Association Sportive Musulmane d'Oran. The club changed the name to Association Sportive Chimiste d'Oran (ASC Oran) from 1977 to 1989 when it was sponsored by the national society SNIC, which had become ENAVA after. In 1989, the club was named Association Sportive Madinet d'Oran.

Achievements
Algerian Ligue 1
Runner-up (1) : 1991
Algerian Ligue 2
Winner (4): 1975, 1977, 1995, 2000
Algerian Cup
Runner-up (2): 1981, 1983

Performance in CAF competitions
CAF Cup: 1 appearance
1992 – Quarter-Final

Stadium
The team plays in the second stadium of Oran, in Stade Habib Bouakeul, which holds 15,000 people.

Crest

Current squad

Notable players
Below are the notable former players who have represented ASM Oran in league and international competition since the club's foundation in 1933. To appear in the section below, a player must have played in at least 100 official matches for the club or represented the national team for which the player is eligible during his stint with ASM Oran or following his departure.

Algeria
  Reda Acimi
  Amar Ammour
  Houari Belkhetouat
  Mohamed Belkheïra
  Ali Benhalima
  Cheïkh Benzerga
  Tayeb Berramla
  Mokhtar Bouhizeb
  Mustapha Boukar
  Boubakeur Chalabi
  Noureddine Daham
  Redouane Guemri
  Moulay Haddou

Algeria
  Miloud Hadefi
  Sofiane Hanister
  Mokhtar Kechamli
  Abdellah Kechra
  Hamid Lefdjah
  Wahid Mebarki
  Senoussi Medjahed
  Fayçal Meguenni
  Brahim Arafat Mezouar
  Slimane Raho
  Abdelkader Reguig (Pons)
  Abdelhafid Tasfaout
  Hamid Tasfaout

Uruguay
  Walter Pelletti

See also
:Category:ASM Oran players

References

External links
ASM Oran Fans website

 
Football clubs in Algeria
ASM Oran
Association football clubs established in 1933
Algerian Ligue Professionnelle 1 clubs
1933 establishments in Algeria
Sports clubs in Algeria